Eurytellina punicea is a species of bivalves belonging to the family Tellinidae.

The species is found in Central and Southern America.

References

Tellinidae
Bivalves described in 1778